Moby Dick is a  elevation glaciated summit located at the head of the Trident Glacier in the eastern Alaska Range, in Alaska, United States. It is the fourth-highest peak in the Hayes Range, a subset of the Alaska Range. Mount Shand, the nearest higher neighbor, is set  to the east. 
The first ascent of this unofficially named mountain was made in 1964 by Christopher Goetze, Lydia Goetze, Tom Knott, and Larry Muir.

Climate

Based on the Köppen climate classification, Moby Dick is located in a subarctic climate zone with long, cold, snowy winters, and mild summers. This climate supports the Trident, Susitna, and Black Rapids Glaciers surrounding this peak. Temperatures can drop below −20 °C with wind chill factors below −30 °C. The months May through June offer the most favorable weather for climbing or viewing. Precipitation runoff from the mountain drains into tributaries of the Susitna and Tanana River drainage basins.

See also

List of the highest major summits of the United States (#154)
List of mountain peaks of Alaska (#34)
Geology of Alaska
Moby Dick (whale)

References

External links
 Moby Dick: Flickr photo
 Weather forecast: National Weather Service
Alaska Range
Landforms of Southeast Fairbanks Census Area, Alaska
Mountains of Alaska
North American 3000 m summits